Hamed Khan (born 3 October 1998) is a Hong Kong international cricketer. He is a right handed batsman and right arm medium bowler. He currently plays for Hongkong cricket team in Twenty 20 International cricket and Pakistan Association of Hongkong team in Hong Kong Premier League T20 Tournament.

In December 2018, he was named in Hong Kong's squad for the 2018 ACC Emerging Teams Asia Cup.

In February 2021, he was selected to play in the 2020 Interport T20I Series against Malaysia. He made his Twenty 20 International debut for Hong Kong on February 20, 2020, against Malaysia. He also represented the Hong Kong Under-19 cricket team before his entry to national team.

References

External links 

Hong Kong cricketers
Hong Kong Twenty20 International cricketers
1998 births
Living people